The 2013 Pittsburgh Panthers football team represented the University of Pittsburgh in the 2013 NCAA Division I FBS football season. The Panthers were led by head coach Paul Chryst and played their home games at Heinz Field. They were a member of the Coastal Division of the Atlantic Coast Conference. This was Pitt's first season as a member of the ACC after being a member of the Big East since 1991. They finished the season 7–6, 3–5 in ACC play to finish in sixth place in the Coastal Division. Pitt was invited to the Little Caesars Pizza Bowl, beating Bowling Green on a field goal by Chris Blewitt in the final two minutes.  Running back, James Conner, rushed for 229 yards and broke a Pittsburgh bowl record previously held by Tony Dorsett.

Schedule

Coaching staff

Roster

Team players drafted into the NFL

References

Pittsburgh
Pittsburgh Panthers football seasons
Little Caesars Pizza Bowl champion seasons
Pittsburgh Panthers football